The Twin Bridges Area at Grand Lake State Park, previously Twin Bridges State Park, is a park on the north side of the Grand Lake o' the Cherokees in northeastern Oklahoma. It was named for the two bridges that carry U.S. Highway 60 over arms of the lake that connect to the Neosho River and the Spring River. Twin Bridges State Park is known for its quiet country atmosphere and excellent fishing for trophy-sized bass, catfish, bluegill, and spoonbill. A fishing center with bait, tackle, and enclosed fishing dock is within the park. Lighted boat ramps, picnic areas, RV and tent campgrounds, snacks, lake huts, playgrounds, volleyball court, and horseshoe pits are also available. Picnic facilities include tables, individual shelters, and group picnic shelters for larger gatherings. Campsites range from semi-modern RV sites to tent camping and offer comfort stations with showers. The park also offers one-room lake huts with electricity, ceiling fans, and screened windows, grills, tables, water, and restroom facilities. The park is also home to the Wildlife Department's Paddlefish Research & Processing Center, which collects important biological data, processes paddlefish meat for anglers, and salvages paddlefish eggs. The Paddlefish Research & Processing Center is open from February 15 to May 15.

Fees
To help fund a backlog of deferred maintenance and park improvements, the state implemented an entrance fee for this park and 21 others effective June 15, 2020. The fees, charged per vehicle, start at $10 per day for a single-day or $8 for residents with an Oklahoma license plate or Oklahoma tribal plate. Fees are waived for honorably discharged veterans and Oklahoma residents age 62 & older and their spouses. Passes good for three days or a week are also available; annual passes good at all 22 state parks charging fees are offered at a cost of $75 for out-of-state visitors or $60 for Oklahoma residents. The 22 parks are:
 Arrowhead Area at Lake Eufaula State Park
 Beavers Bend State Park
 Boiling Springs State Park
 Cherokee Landing State Park
 Fort Cobb State Park
 Foss State Park
 Honey Creek Area at Grand Lake State Park
 Great Plains State Park
 Great Salt Plains State Park
 Greenleaf State Park
 Keystone State Park
 Lake Eufaula State Park
 Lake Murray State Park
 Lake Texoma State Park
 Lake Thunderbird State Park
 Lake Wister State Park
 Natural Falls State Park
 Osage Hills State Park
 Robbers Cave State Park
 Sequoyah State Park
 Tenkiller State Park
 Twin Bridges Area at Grand Lake State Park

References

State parks of Oklahoma
State parks of the U.S. Interior Highlands
Protected areas of Ottawa County, Oklahoma